"Spirit in the Dark" is a song written and performed by Aretha Franklin.  The song was produced by Arif Mardin, Jerry Wexler, and Tom Dowd.

Background
Aretha Franklin's recording of "Spirit in the Dark" features the Dixie Flyers. The song appeared on her 1970 album, Spirit in the Dark.

Chart performance
The song reached #3 on the U.S. R&B chart and #23 on the Billboard Hot 100 in 1970.

Aretha Franklin

References

1970 songs
1970 singles
Songs written by Aretha Franklin
Aretha Franklin songs
Song recordings produced by Arif Mardin
Song recordings produced by Jerry Wexler
Song recordings produced by Tom Dowd
Atlantic Records singles
Soul songs